The medical term kyphosis has several meanings.

 A deformity, where the back is bowed (see kyphosis article for more details)
 A term describing the normally convex (arched, kyphotic) segments of the spine, also called primary curvatures.
 When related to a single vertebra, describes the angle created between the superior and inferior endplates.

See also:
Kyphosus